John Robert "Jack" Spinks (August 15, 1930September 29, 1994) was a professional American football fullback in the National Football League. He played five seasons for the Pittsburgh Steelers (1952), the Chicago Cardinals (1953), the Green Bay Packers (1955–1956), and the New York Giants (1956–1957).  The stadium for the Alcorn State Braves is named in honor of Jack Spinks.

1930 births
1994 deaths
People from Lauderdale County, Mississippi
Players of American football from Mississippi
American football fullbacks
Alcorn State Braves football players
Pittsburgh Steelers players
Chicago Cardinals players
Green Bay Packers players
New York Giants players